The European Journal of International Law is a quarterly law journal covering international law in a combination of theoretical and practical approaches. It also provides coverage of the relationship between international law and European Union law. The journal was established in 1990 by a group of scholars based at the European University Institute, universities in Florence and Munich, Panthéon-Assas University, and the Michigan Law School.

The journal has close links with the European Society of International Law (ESIL). Members of the ESIL get online subscription to the Journal.

Originally bilingual in English and French, it now publishes in English only. New content is reserved to subscribers, but becomes available open access after 12 months. The full text of one lead article and all review essays and book reviews of the current year are also accessible for free online.

The journal is published by Oxford University Press and the editors-in-chief are Sarah M. H. Nouwen (Lauterpacht Centre for International Law) and Joseph H. H. Weiler (New York University Law School). The journal is released four times a year.

According to the Journal Citation Reports, the journal has a 2020 impact factor of 1.833, ranking it 49th out of 151 journals in the category "Law" and 49th out of 94 journals in the category "International Relations".

See also 
 American Journal of International Law
 EJIL: Talk!
 List of international relations journals
 List of law journals

References

External links
 

International law journals
Publications established in 1990
Quarterly journals
English-language journals
Oxford University Press academic journals
Delayed open access journals